The Kid Comes Back is a 1938 prizefight film directed by B. Reeves Eason and starring Wayne Morris, Barton MacLane, June Travis and "Slapsie Maxie" Rosenbloom.  The title may be meant to remind audiences of Kid Galahad, a smash hit prizefight movie released the previous year starring Edward G. Robinson, Bette Davis, Humphrey Bogart, and Wayne Morris in the title role as a young boxer very similar to his part in The Kid Comes Back.

External links
 The Kid Comes Back at the Internet Movie Database

1938 films
Films directed by B. Reeves Eason
1938 comedy-drama films
American boxing films
American comedy-drama films
American black-and-white films
1930s American films